Neri or Néri may refer to:

Places
Neri, Iran, a village in West Azerbaijan Province
Neri, India, a village in the north Indian state Himachal
Neri River, a river in Ethiopia

People and fictional characters
Neri (surname)
Neri (given name)
Francisco Valmerino Neri (born 1976), Brazilian footballer known as "Neri"
Neri, a main character in the series Ocean Girl
Al Neri, a fictional character from The Godfather

Other uses
National Environmental Research Institute of Denmark
Neri (grape), another name for the French wine grape Grolleau
 Neri, a starchy substance used in the manufacture of Japanese washi paper, derived from the root of the plant Abelmoschus manihot (tororo aoi)
Néri, a Tibetan classification of mountains